The Four Diamonds is a fantasy themed, allegorical short story written by Chris Millard in 1972 shortly before succumbing to cancer at the age of 14. After returning from summer vacation, his teacher told Chris' class to write a story about what they did during their vacation. Chris had spent the summer being treated for his illness, and asked his teacher if he could write something else, to which she agreed. He wrote about adventures and struggle of an aspiring knight, also named Millard, to conquer Raptenahad (a play on "rhabdomyosarcoma," the cancer Chris had), a magic-wielding evil queen who symbolized his illness. To defeat her, the story's Millard has to complete four difficult tasks.

The story gave its name to the Four Diamonds Fund, a childhood cancer-centered charitable organization established in 1972 by Chris' parents Charles and Irma. The story was also turned into a Disney TV movie in 1995.

Story
The story relates the quest of teenage squire Millard to prove his knighthood for King Arthur preliminary to questing for the Holy Grail. Millard decides to do this by ridding a distant land of the evil sorceress Raptenahad and liberate it of her many curses. Once captured by Raptenahad, the young hero attempts repeatedly to regain his freedom and vanquish her. The witch begins to admire her captive for his courage, and offers Millard to try and collect the Diamonus Quadrus (the Four Diamonds) of Courage, Wisdom, Honesty and Strength in order to defeat her (these were virtues Chris believed were necessary in the battle against cancer). If Millard accomplished every difficult task she assigned him, he would be freed and her reign would end forever. Eventually, his continued success enrages Raptenahad and, fearing for her life, she determines to destroy him on his final challenge, however he manages to overcome all obstacles and completes it too. With the sorceress being no more, and her curses lifted, the knight takes over her former castle as his own palace and the story of Sir Millard begins.

Film adaptation

The Four Diamonds television film, written by Todd Robinson and directed by Peter Werner, was broadcast on August 12, 1995, starring Tom Guiry as Chris Millard and Squire Millard, Christine Lahti co-starred as Chris' doctor and the sorceress Queen Raptenahad, Kevin Dunn as Charles Millard and the wizard Charles the Mysterious, and Jayne Brook as Irma Millard and Hermit of the Lagoon. The film weaves the stages of Millard's real life with Arthurian parallels in the story.

See also
Four Diamonds Fund
Penn State IFC/Panhellenic Dance Marathon

References

Press coverage
Beth Kleid, Brave Heart: A Young Boy Battling Cancer Writes A Story Inspiring Others To Face Life's Obstacles, Los Angeles Times, August 6, 1995
Kate O'Hare, Diamonds' Sparkle In Tribute To A Boy's Legacy, Chicago Tribune, August 6, 1995
Tony Scott, A Disney Channel Premiere Film the Four Diamonds, Variety, August 7, 1995
Walter Goodman, Boy's Short Life Blends With a Fantasy He Wrote, The New York Times, August 11, 1995
Hal Boedeker, Mush And Medicine Collide, Orlando Sentinel, August 12, 1995

External links

1972 short stories
1995 drama films
1995 television films
1995 films
1995 fantasy films
American fantasy films
Arthurian films
Disney Channel original films
Films directed by Peter Werner
Fantasy short stories
1990s American films